Surge of Power: The Stuff of Heroes is a 2004 independent film directed by Mike Donahue and starring Vincent J. Roth, John T. Venturini, Joey Bourgeois, and Robert Hurt.

Plot
The plot concerns corporate attorney and comic fan Gavin Lucas being caught in a laboratory explosion engineered by embittered scientist Hector Harris. Lucas develops the power to channel energy into powerful blasts, sense approaching people and detect energy flows nearby. He uses these abilities to become Surge, a superhero. Harris's former partner, Ronald Richards, develops a number of gadgets for Surge such as a bulletproof costume and gauntlets that have concealed blades for escaping ropes and spray strands to restrain criminals. Harris also develops superpowers from the explosion and is able to control metal objects via magnetism and takes the name Metal Master. Surge constantly encounters a nameless "Young Man" whom he repeatedly needs to save from danger and who is implied to be attracted to Surge.

Celebrity Cameos
Surge of Power featured a large number of celebrity cameos.

Noel Neill appears as a bystander when Surge foils a bank robbery. The Young Man tells her, "I take after you Aunt Lois" when she admonishes him to stay out of trouble in the aftermath.
 Surge bumps into Lou Ferrigno when out on patrol, and observes that with muscles like his Ferrigno could be a superhero as well. {This was an in joke reference to Ferrigno appearance on The Incredible Hulk}
 Len Wein and Marv Wolfman appear as the writers of the Justice Brigade comic book who discuss ideas for the characters, such as a spin-off series about the heroes' teenage sidekicks.
 Nichelle Nichols plays the retired superhero The Omen to give Surge advice and encouragement when he's frustrated at his lack of success tracking down Metal Master.

Other celebrity guest stars include Forrest J. Ackerman, Marty Krofft, Bernard Fox, Lisa Loring, Rose Marie, Bobby Trendy and Butch Patrick.

This is Bernard Fox's final film role before his retirement and death in 2016.

Sequel

A sequel, Surge of Power: Revenge of the Sequel, was released in 2016.

External links

Website for the sequel: Surge of Power: Revenge of the Sequel

2004 films
American superhero comedy films
2000s superhero comedy films
2000s English-language films
2004 comedy films
2000s American films